The Screen Actors Guild Award for Outstanding Performance by a Female Actor in a Supporting Role in a Motion Picture is an award given by the Screen Actors Guild to honor the finest acting achievements in film.

Winners and nominees

Legend:

1990s

2000s

2010s

2020s

Superlatives

Multiple winners
Two awards
 Kate Winslet (Sense and Sensibility  (1995), The Reader  (2008))

Multiple nominees
Note: Winners are indicated in bold type.

Two nominations
 Kathy Bates (Primary Colors (1998), About Schmidt (2002))
 Penélope Cruz (Vicky Cristina Barcelona (2008), Nine (2009))
 Jamie Lee Curtis (True Lies (1994), Everything Everywhere All at Once (2022))
 Viola Davis (Doubt (2008), Fences (2016))
 Cameron Diaz (Being John Malkovich (1999), Vanilla Sky (2001))
 Sally Field (Forrest Gump (1994), Lincoln (2012))
 Holly Hunter (Thirteen (2003), The Big Sick (2017))
 Frances McDormand (Almost Famous (2000), North Country (2005))
 Helen Mirren (Gosford Park (2001), Trumbo (2015))
 Margot Robbie (Mary Queen of Scots (2018), Bombshell (2019))
 Octavia Spencer (The Help (2011), Hidden Figures (2016))
 Emma Stone (Birdman (2014), The Favourite (2018))
 Rachel Weisz (The Constant Gardner (2005), The Favourite (2018))
 Michelle Williams (Brokeback Mountain (2005), Manchester by the Sea (2016))
 Renée Zellweger (Jerry Maguire (1996), Cold Mountain (2003))
 Hong Chau (Downsizing (2017), The Whale (2022))

Three nominations
 Judi Dench (Shakespeare in Love (1998), Chocolat (2000), The Shipping News (2001))
 Catherine Keener (Being John Malkovich (1999), Capote (2005), Into the Wild (2007))
 Nicole Kidman (The Paperboy (2012), Lion (2016), Bombshell (2019))
 Julianne Moore (Boogie Nights (1997), Magnolia (1999), The Hours (2002))

Four nominations
 Amy Adams (Junebug (2005), Doubt (2008), The Fighter (2010), Vice (2018))
 Kate Winslet (Sense and Sensibility (1995), Quills (2000), The Reader (2008), Steve Jobs (2015))

Five nominations
 Cate Blanchett (Bandits (2001), The Aviator (2004), Notes on a Scandal (2006), I'm Not There (2007), Nightmare Alley (2021))

See also
 Academy Award for Best Supporting Actress
 BAFTA Award for Best Actress in a Supporting Role
 Independent Spirit Award for Best Supporting Female
 Critics' Choice Movie Award for Best Supporting Actress
 Golden Globe Award for Best Supporting Actress – Motion Picture

External links
 SAG Awards official site

Female Actor Supporting Role
 
Film awards for supporting actress